Nomu is a 1974 Indian Telugu-language film directed by Pattu and produced by M. Balu, A. Kumaran, M. Murugan and M. Saravanan under the banner AVM Productions. It is a remake of the Tamil film Vellikizhamai Viratham. The film stars Rama Krishna, Chandrakala, Sarath Babu, Jayasudha and K. V. Chalam. The film had musical score by Chellapilla Satyam.

Cast 
 Rama Krishna as Eeshwar
 Chandrakala as Parvati
 Sarath Babu as Kanaka Rao
 Jayasudha as Lata
 K.V. Chalam as Puli Raju

Soundtrack 
 "Kalise Kallalona" — P. Susheela and S. P. Balasubrahmanyam
 "Manase Jathaga Paadindhile" — P. Susheela and S. P. Balasubrahmanyam
 "Nomu Pandinchava" — P. Susheela
 "Andari Daivam Neevanna" — P. Susheela
 "Thaka Thaka Thaka" — S. Janaki

References

External links 
 

1974 films
Hindu devotional films
Films about snakes
Indian romantic musical films
Films scored by Satyam (composer)
AVM Productions films
1970s Telugu-language films
Telugu remakes of Tamil films
Films about shapeshifting